Sir Thomas Slade (1703/4–1771) was an English naval architect, most famous for designing HMS Victory, Lord Nelson's flagship at the Battle of Trafalgar in 1805.

Early life

He was the son of Arthur Slade (1682–1746) and his wife Hannah Moore. His paternal uncle was Benjamin Slade, Master Shipwright at Deptford Dockyard.

Career outline
Like many who rose to the pinnacle of the design of British sailing warships, Thomas Slade began as a shipwright in the Royal Dockyards. His uncle Benjamin Slade was Master Shipwright at Plymouth Dockyard (a master shipwright was responsible for all ship construction and repair at the dockyard in which he served).

In 1744 Thomas became Deputy Master Shipwright at Woolwich Dockyard. On 22 November 1750 he replaced his uncle, who had died that year, as Master Shipwright at Plymouth. On 27 May 1752 he was transferred temporarily back to Woolwich Dockyard as Master Shipwright, and from there to Chatham Dockyard on 17 June 1752 and subsequently on 15 March 1753 to Deptford Dockyard, where he remained until 5 August 1755.

He was appointed Surveyor of the Navy in August 1755 by George Anson, First Lord of the Admiralty, serving until his death in February 1771. For the first decade, he shared the appointment with William Bately, formerly the Deputy Surveyor of the Navy, until the latter's retirement in June 1765. On Bately's retirement, John Williams was appointed to share the post. Nevertheless, Slade was clearly the senior surveyor throughout his tenure.

He was knighted on 27 January 1768.

Achievements

According to N. A. M. Rodger:
 The ships which [he] designed...were admirably suited to Britain's strategic requirements...By common consent, Slade was the greatest British naval architect of the century...it was generally agreed (even by themselves) that his successors, though competent designers, never matched his genius.

During this tenure, Slade was responsible for several major design changes. He produced a 'generic design' that was used as a template for the Royal Navy's 74-gun ships and frigates. At least forty-six '74's were built to his designs; the last was launched in 1789.

He also designed HMS Asia, which was the first true 64-gun ship. As a result, the Royal Navy ordered no further 60-gun ships but instead commissioned more 64s. Because these incorporated alterations learned from trials with Asia, subsequent ships were bigger, she was the only ship of her draught (class).

Slade also designed smaller vessels, such as the 10-gun Board of Customs cutter, HMS Sherborne.

Victory was his most famous single vessel. Once commissioned, she became the most successful first-rate ship of the line ever built. On 13 December 1758, the Board of Admiralty in London placed an order for the construction of 12 new ships of the line, including one of 100 guns. The following year the Admiralty chose the name Victory for this vessel, despite the previous holders of the name having been largely unsuccessful. In 1758, Nelson was born, who would die on her decks at Trafalgar.

Out of the 33 ships which were available to Nelson at Trafalgar, eight (Africa, Victory, Agamemnon, Bellerophon, Defiance, Thunderer, Defence, and Prince) were built to Thomas Slade's designs. Two more of his ships (Swiftsure and Berwick) had been captured by the French earlier and fought on the French side. Slade's designs represented 24% of Nelson's ships and 29% of his guns.

Designs

This table lists ships that were built to designs drawn up by Thomas Slade. Some of them were not ordered until after his death.

Death

Sir Thomas Slade died on 23 February 1771 in Bath, and is buried in St Clement's churchyard, Grimwade Street, Ipswich. His will was proven on 19 March 1771 (Prob. 11/965). His wife Hannah and her parents were buried next to the west boundary of the churchyard.

Legacy
Slade Point  on the central Queensland coast was named after him.

His 1745 apprentice John Henslow (later Sir John) also became Chief Surveyor to the Navy in 1784 and was the grandfather of Darwin's mentor John Henslow.

Notes

References

The Billy Ruffian: The Bellerophon and the Downfall of Napoleon (2003) - David Cordingly, Bloomsbury, USA.
British Napoleonic Ship-Of-The-Line (2001) - Angus Konstam [Tony Bryan, Illustrator], Osprey Publishing.
British Warships in the Age of Sail, 1714 to 1792 (2007) - Rif Winfield, Seaforth Publishing. .
British Warships in the Age of Sail, 1793 to 1817 (2005) - Rif Winfield, Chatham Publishing.
The 74-gun ship Bellona (1985) - Brian Lavery. .

1700s births
Surveyors of the Navy
1771 deaths
Knights Bachelor